Henry Huston "Harry" Morgan (17 February 1871 – 5 November 1924) was an Australian rules footballer who played with Carlton in the Victorian Football League (VFL).

Notes

External links 
		
Harry Morgan's profile at Blueseum

Australian rules footballers from Melbourne
Carlton Football Club players
West Melbourne Football Club players
1871 births
1924 deaths